Acquanegra Cremonese is a comune (municipality) in the Province of Cremona in the Italian region Lombardy, located about  southeast of Milan and about  northwest of Cremona.

Acquanegra Cremonese borders the following municipalities: Crotta d'Adda, Grumello Cremonese ed Uniti, Sesto ed Uniti, Spinadesco.

References

Cities and towns in Lombardy
Articles which contain graphical timelines